Sandstone School may refer to:

Sandstone School (Sandstone, Minnesota), listed on the National Register of Historic Places in Pine County, Minnesota
Sandstone School (Keene, North Dakota), listed on the National Register of Historic Places in McKenzie County, North Dakota